Basie's Beatle Bag is a 1966 studio album by Count Basie and his orchestra, arranged by Chico O'Farrill. Basie released a second album of Beatles songs, Basie on the Beatles, in 1969.

Track listing 
 "Help!" – 2:15
 "Can't Buy Me Love" – 3:21
 "Michelle" – 2:43
 "I Wanna Be Your Man" – 3:20
 "Do You Want to Know a Secret" – 2:59
 "A Hard Day's Night" – 4:22
 "All My Loving" – 2:59
 "Yesterday" – 3:04
 "And I Love Her" – 2:49
 "Hold Me Tight" – 2:44
 "She Loves You" – 2:54
 "Kansas City" (Jerry Leiber, Mike Stoller) – 4:00

All songs written by Lennon and McCartney, except where otherwise noted.

Personnel 
The Count Basie Orchestra

 Count Basie – piano, organ
 Sonny Cohn – trumpet
 Al Aarons
 Wallace Davenport
 Phil Guilbeau
 Grover Mitchell – trombone
 Bill Hughes
 Henderson Chambers
 Al Grey
 Marshal Royal – alto saxophone
 Bobby Plater
 Eric Dixon – tenor saxophone
 Eddie "Lockjaw" Davis
 Charlie Fowlkes – baritone saxophone
 Freddie Green – guitar
 Norman Keenan – double bass
 Sonny Payne – drums
 Chico O'Farrill – arranger

References 

1966 albums
Count Basie Orchestra albums
Verve Records albums
The Beatles tribute albums
Albums produced by Teddy Reig
Albums arranged by Chico O'Farrill